Robert Stephen Lasnik (born 1951) is an American attorney and jurist, who serves as a senior United States district judge of the United States District Court for the Western District of Washington.

Education and career

Born in Staten Island, New York, Lasnik received an Artium Baccalaureus degree from Brandeis University in 1972 and a Master of Science in journalism from Northwestern University in 1973, a Master of Arts in counseling also from Northwestern University in 1974, and a Juris Doctor from the University of Washington School of Law in 1978.

From 1978 to 1990, Lasnik worked in the office of the King County Prosecuting Attorney, including five years as a deputy prosecutor (from 1978 to 1981), two years as a senior deputy prosecutor (from 1981 to 1983), and seven years as chief of staff to longtime King County Prosecutor Norm Maleng (from 1983 to 1990). In his time with the King County Prosecuting Attorney's office, Lasnik prosecuted a number of high-profile cases, many with future King County Superior Court Judge William L. Downing. The pair prosecuted three cases stemming from the Wah Mee Massacre, the infamous 1983 robbery-homicide that ended in the murder of thirteen employees and patrons of the Wah Mee Club in Seattle's International District. Lasnik and Downing also successfully prosecuted David Lewis Rice, who on Christmas Eve in 1986 murdered all four members of a prominent Seattle family based on the mistaken belief they were part of a Jewish-communist conspiracy.

Lasnik served as a superior court judge on the King County Superior Court from 1990 to 1998. While on the Superior Court bench, Lasnik made important rulings involving the Seattle Mariners' stadium and in 1995 ruled that the University of Washington regents violated the Open Meetings Act in their search for a new president.

Federal judicial service

Lasnik was nominated to the United States District Court for the Western District of Washington by President Bill Clinton on May 11, 1998, to a seat vacated by Carolyn R. Dimmick. He was confirmed by the United States Senate on October 21, 1998, and received his commission on October 22, 1998. He served as chief judge from 2004 to 2011. He assumed senior status on January 27, 2016.

Notable cases
Lasnik temporarily blocked Seattle's first-in-the-nation law allowing drivers for a ridesharing company, such as Uber and Lyft, to unionize over pay and working conditions. In August 2017, Lasnik then determined that the city had state action immunity for the alleged violations of the Sherman Antitrust Act.  That judgment was partially reversed by a unanimous panel of the United States Court of Appeals for the Ninth Circuit in May 2018.

On August 27, 2018, Judge Lasnik blocked the Defense Distributed and its founder, Cody Wilson, from posting 3D-printed gun blueprints online. Judge Lasnik first imposed a temporary restraining order on Wilson, but that was due to expire, so he mandated a preliminary injunction that blocks online distribution in the United States while the legal proceedings are ongoing.

See also
 List of Jewish American jurists

References

Sources

1951 births
Living people
Brandeis University alumni
Judges of the United States District Court for the Western District of Washington
Medill School of Journalism alumni
Northwestern University alumni
People from Staten Island
Superior court judges in the United States
United States district court judges appointed by Bill Clinton
University of Washington School of Law alumni
Lawyers from Seattle
20th-century American judges
21st-century American judges